John Johansen may refer to:

John Johansen (athlete) (1883–1947), Norwegian sprinter
John Anker Johansen (1894–1986), Norwegian gymnast
John Christen Johansen (1876–1964), Danish-American portraitist
John M. Johansen (1916–2012), American architect
John Lind Johansen (1852–?), Norwegian politician for the Labour Party